The 2022–23 season is Northampton Town's 125th year in their history and the club's second consecutive season in League Two. Along with League Two, the club also competed in the FA Cup, the EFL Cup and the EFL Trophy. The season covers the period from 1 July 2022 to 30 June 2023.

Players

Pre-season
On 3 June, the Cobblers announced that an XI side will face AFC Rushden & Diamonds during pre-season. Three days later, a home friendly against West Bromwich Albion was confirmed. A second home friendly was later added to the calendar, against Luton Town. On June 16, Northampton announced they would travel to Cheltenham Town during pre-season. A pre-season friendly whilst in Scotland was confirmed against St Mirren.

Competitions

League Two

League table

Results summary

League position by match

Matches

The 2022/23 league fixtures were announced on June 23.

FA Cup

Northampton were drawn away to Chesterfield in the first round.

EFL Cup

Northampton Town were drawn at home to Wycombe Wanderers in the first round.

Papa John's Trophy

On 20 June, the initial Group stage draw was made, grouping Northmpton Town with Ipswich Town and Cambridge United. Three days later, Arsenal U21s joined Southern Group H.

Appearances, goals and cards

Awards

Divisional awards

Transfers

Transfers in

Loans in

Transfers out

Loans out

References

Northampton Town
Northampton Town F.C. seasons